Parasite is a 2019 South Korean black comedy thriller film directed by Bong Joon-ho. The screenplay was co-written by Bong and Han Jin-won. The film stars Song Kang-ho, Lee Sun-kyun, Cho Yeo-jeong, Choi Woo-shik, Park So-dam and Jang Hye-jin. It won the Palme d'Or at the 2019 Cannes Film Festival, becoming the first Korean film to receive the award as well as the first film to do so with a unanimous vote since 2013's Blue Is the Warmest Colour. It was selected as the South Korean entry for Best International Feature Film at the 92nd Academy Awards, Bong's second selection after 2009's Mother.

Parasite premiered at the 72nd Cannes Film Festival on 21 May 2019. It was released in South Korea by CJ Entertainment on 30 May 2019, and in the rest of the world by Neon in late-2019. The film had a limited release on 11 October 2019 in Los Angeles and New York City, before expanding wider starting 18 October. It has grossed $257 million worldwide including $53.3 million in the United States and Canada, becoming Bong's highest-grossing release; it is currently the nineteenth highest-grossing domestic film in South Korea history. Rotten Tomatoes, a review aggregator surveyed 467 reviews and judged 99% to be positive.

Parasite received widespread critical acclaim, with particular praise for Bong's screenplay and direction, editing, and production values, as well as the performances of the actors, especially Song. Among its numerous accolades, Parasite won four awards at the 92nd Academy Awards for Best Picture, Best Director, Best Original Screenplay and Best International Feature Film. It became the first South Korean film to receive Academy Award recognition, as well as the first non-English-language film to win Best Picture.

At the 77th Golden Globe Awards, the film had three nominations, winning Best Foreign Language Film. At the 73rd British Academy Film Awards, the film received four nominations including, Best Film and Best Direction and won for Best Original Screenplay and Best Film Not in the English Language. At the Screen Actors Guild Awards, it became the first non-English language film to win for Outstanding Performance by a Cast in a Motion Picture.

Accolades
{| class="wikitable plainrowheaders sortable"
|+
|-
! scope="col" style="width:20%;"| Award
! scope="col" style="width:14%;"| Date of ceremony
! scope="col" style="width:25%;"| Category
! scope="col" style="width:35%;"| Recipient(s)
! scope="col" style="width:5%;" | Result
! scope="col" style="width:6%;" class="unsortable" |
|-
! rowspan="5" scope="row" |AACTA Awards
|4 December 2019
| Best Asian Film
|Bong Joon-ho
|  
|
|-
| rowspan="4" |3 January 2020
|Best International Film
|Kwak Sin-ae and Bong Joon-ho
| 
| rowspan="4" |
|-
|Best International Direction
|Bong Joon-ho
| 
|-
|Best International Supporting Actor
|Song Kang-ho
| 
|-
|Best International Screenplay
|Bong Joon-ho and Han Jin-won
| 
|-
! rowspan="2" scope="row" |AARP's Movies for Grownups Awards
| rowspan="2" | 11 January 2020
| Best Intergenerational Film
| rowspan="2" |Parasite
|  
| rowspan="2" |
|-
| Best Foreign Language Film
| 
|-
! rowspan="6" scope="row" |Academy Awards
| rowspan="6" |9 February 2020
|Best Picture
|Kwak Sin-ae and Bong Joon-ho
|  
| rowspan="6" |
|- 
|Best Director
|Bong Joon-ho
|  
|- 
|Best Original Screenplay
|Bong Joon-ho and Han Jin-won
|  
|- 
|Best International Feature Film
|South Korea
|  
|- 
|Best Film Editing
|Yang Jin-mo
| 
|- 
|Best Production Design
| Lee Ha-jun and Cho Won-woo
|  
|-
! rowspan="3" scope="row" |African-American Film Critics Association
| rowspan="3" | 10 December 2019
| Top Ten Films
|Parasite
| 
| rowspan="3" |
|-
| Best Screenplay
|Bong Joon-ho and Han Jin-won
| 
|-
| Best Foreign Film
| rowspan="2" |Parasite
| 
|-
! rowspan="6" scope="row" |Alliance of Women Film Journalists
| rowspan="6" | 10 January 2020
| Best Film
| 
| rowspan="6" |
|-
| Best Director
|Bong Joon-ho
| 
|-
| Best Original Screenplay
|Bong Joon-ho and Han Jin-won
| 
|-
| Best Ensemble
|Parasite
| 
|-
| Best Editing
|Yang Jin-mo
| 
|-
| Best Non-English Language Film
| rowspan="2" |Parasite
| 
|-
! scope="row" | Amanda Awards
| 14 August 2020
| Best Foreign Feature Film
| 
| 
|-
! scope="row" |American Cinema Editors
|17 January 2020
|Best Edited Feature Film – Dramatic
|Yang Jin-mo
| 
|
|-
! scope="row" |American Film Institute Awards
|3 January 2020
| AFI Special Award
|Parasite
| 
|
|-
! scope="row" |Art Directors Guild Awards
| 1 February 2020
|Excellence in Production Design for a Contemporary Feature Film
| Lee Ha-jun
| 
|
|-
! scope="row" |Asia Pacific Screen Awards
|21 November 2019
|Best Feature Film
| rowspan="2" |Kwak Sin-ae and Bong Joon-ho
|  
|
|-
! rowspan="10" scope="row" | Asian Film Awards
| rowspan="10" | 28 October 2020
|Best Film
|  
|rowspan=10|
|-
|Best Director
|Bong Joon-ho
| 
|-
|Best Supporting Actor
|Choi Woo-shik
| 
|-
|Best Supporting Actress
|Lee Jung-eun
| 
|-
|Best Screenplay
|Bong Joon-ho and Han Jin-won
|  
|-
|Best Editing
|Yang Jin-mo
|  
|-
|Best Original Music
|Jung Jae-il
| 
|-
|Best Production Design
|Lee Ha-jun
|  
|-
|Best Sound
|Choi Tae-young
| 
|-
|Best Visual Effects
|Hong Jeong-ho
| 
|-
! rowspan="4" scope="row"| Atlanta Film Critics Circle
| rowspan="4"|2 December 2019
| Top 10 Films 
| Parasite
| 
| rowspan="4"|
|-
| Best Director
|Bong Joon-ho
| 
|-
| Best Screenplay
|Bong Joon-ho and Han Jin-won
| 
|-
| Best Foreign Language Film
| rowspan="4" |Parasite
|
|-
! rowspan="10" scope="row" |Austin Film Critics Association
| rowspan="10" | 6 January 2020
| Top Ten Films of the Decade
| 
| rowspan="10" |
|-
| Top Ten Films of the Year
| 
|-
| Best Film
| 
|-
| Best Director
|Bong Joon-ho
| 
|-
| Best Supporting Actor
|Song Kang-ho
| 
|-
| Best Ensemble
|Parasite
|  
|-
| Best Original Screenplay
|Bong Joon-ho and Han Jin-won
| 
|-
| Best Cinematography
| Hong Kyung-pyo
| 
|-
| Best Editing
|Yang Jin-mo
| 
|-
| Best Foreign Language Film
| rowspan="3" |Parasite
| 
|-
! scope="row" |Australian Film Critics Association
| 7 February 2020
| Best International Film (Foreign Language)
| 
|
|-
! scope="row" |Bandung Film Festival
| 22 November 2019
| Honorable Imported Films
| 
|
|-
! scope="row" |Belgian Cinematographic Press Union
|30 January 2020
|Grand Prix
|Bong Joon-ho
|
|
|-
! scope="row" |Belgian Film Critics Association
| 4 January 2020
|Grand Prix
|Parasite
| 
|
|-
! rowspan="14" scope="row" |Baeksang Arts Awards
| rowspan="14" |5 June 2020
| rowspan="2" |Grand Prize (Daesang)
|Bong Joon-ho
|
| rowspan="14" |
|-
| rowspan="2" |Parasite
|
|-
|Best Film
|
|-
|Best Director
|Bong Joon-ho
|
|-
|Best Actor
|Song Kang-ho
|
|-
|Best Actress
|Cho Yeo-jeong
|
|-
|Best Supporting Actor
|Park Myung-hoon
|
|-
| rowspan="2" |Best Supporting Actress
|Lee Jung-eun
|
|-
|Park So-dam
|
|-
|Best New Actor
|Park Myung-hoon
|
|-
|Best New Actress
|Jang Hye-jin
|
|-
|Best Screenplay
|Bong Joon-ho and Han Jin-won
|
|-
| rowspan="2" |Technical Award
|Hong Kyung-pyo
|
|-
|Lee Ha-jun
|
|-
! scope="row" |BFE Cut Above Awards
| 5 March 2021
| Best Edited Single Drama
| Yang Jin-mo
| 
| |
|-
! rowspan="2" scope="row" |Black Film Critics Circle Awards
|rowspan="2"|19 December 2019
| Best Picture 
|rowspan="3"|Parasite
| 
|rowspan="2"|
|-
| Best Foreign Film 
| 
|-
! rowspan="12" scope="row" |Blue Dragon Film Awards
| rowspan="12" |21 November 2019
| Best Film
| 
| rowspan="12" |
|-
| Best Director
|Bong Joon-ho
| 
|-
| Best Actor
|Song Kang-ho
| 
|-
| Best Actress
|Cho Yeo-jeong
| 
|-
| Best Supporting Actor
|Park Myung-hoon
| 
|-
| rowspan="2" | Best Supporting Actress
|Lee Jung-eun
| 
|-
|Park So-dam
| 
|-
| Best Screenplay
|Bong Joon-ho and Han Jin-won
| 
|-
| Best Cinematography and Lighting
| Hong Kyung-pyo, Kim Chang-ho
| 
|-
| Best Editing
|Yang Jin-mo
| 
|-
| Best Music
| Jung Jae-il
| 
|-
| Best Art Direction
| Lee Ha-jun
| 
|-
! scope="row" |Blue Ribbon Awards
| 24 February 2021
| Best Foreign Film
| rowspan=3|Parasite
| 
| 
|-
! scope="row" |Bodil Awards
| 29 February 2020
|Best Non-American Film
| 
|
|-
! rowspan="4" scope="row" |Boston Online Film Critics Association
| rowspan="4"|14 December 2019
| Best Picture 
| 
| rowspan="4"|
|-
| Best Director
| Bong Joon-ho
| 
|-
| Best Foreign Language Film  
| rowspan=2|Parasite
| 
|-
| Top 10 Best Films of the Year
| 
|-
! rowspan="3" scope="row" |Boston Society of Film Critics
| rowspan="3" |15 December 2019
|Best Director
|Bong Joon-ho
| 
| rowspan="3" |
|-
|Best Foreign Language Film
| rowspan="2" |Parasite
| 
|-
| Best Ensemble Cast
| 
|-
! rowspan="4" scope="row" |British Academy Film Awards
| rowspan="4" |2 February 2020
|Best Film
|Kwak Sin-ae and Bong Joon-ho
| 
| rowspan="4" |
|-
|Best Director
|Bong Joon-ho
| 
|-
|Best Original Screenplay
|Bong Joon-ho and Han Jin-won
| 
|-
|Best Film Not in the English Language
|Bong Joon-ho
| 
|-
! scope="row" |British Independent Film Awards
|1 December 2019
|Best International Independent Film
| rowspan="2" |Parasite
| 
|
|-
! rowspan="11" scope="row" |Buil Film Awards
| rowspan="11" |4 October 2019
| Best Film
| 
| rowspan="11" |
|-
| Best Director
|Bong Joon-ho
| 
|-
| Best Actor
|Choi Woo-shik
| 
|-
| Best Actress
|Cho Yeo-jeong
| 
|-
| Best Supporting Actor
|Park Myung-hoon
| 
|-
| rowspan="2" |Best Supporting Actress
|Lee Jung-eun
| 
|-
|Jang Hye-jin
| 
|-
| Best Screenplay
|Bong Joon-ho and Han Jin-won
| 
|-
| Best Cinematography
| Hong Kyung-pyo
| 
|-
| Best Music
| Jung Jae-il
| 
|-
| Best Art Direction
| Lee Ha-jun
| 
|-
! scope="row" |Busan Film Critics Awards
| 26 November 2019
| Best Actress
|Lee Jung-eun
| 
|
|-
! scope="row" |Cahiers du Cinéma
| 6 January 2020
|Top 10 Lists
| rowspan="2" |Parasite
|  
|
|-
! scope="row" |Calgary International Film Festival
| 3 October 2019
| Fan Favourite Award
| 
|
|-
! scope="row" |Cannes Film Festival
|25 May 2019
|Palme d'Or
|Bong Joon-ho
| 
|
|-
! scope="row" |César Awards
|28 February 2020
|Best Foreign Film
| rowspan="2" |Parasite
| 
|
|-
! rowspan="7" scope="row" |Chicago Film Critics Association
| rowspan="7" |14 December 2019
|Best Film
| 
| rowspan="7" |
|-
|Best Director
|Bong Joon-ho
| 
|-
|Best Supporting Actress
|Cho Yeo-jeong
| 
|-
|Best Original Screenplay
|Bong Joon-ho and Han Jin-won
| 
|-
| Best Art Direction
| Lee Ha-jun
| 
|-
|Best Cinematography
| Hong Kyung-pyo
| 
|-
|Best Foreign Language Film
| rowspan="2"|Parasite
| 
|-
! rowspan="6" scope="row" |Chlotrudis Awards
| rowspan="6" | 25 March 2020
| Best Movie
| 
| rowspan="6"|
|-
| Best Director
| Bong Joon-ho
| 
|-
| Performance by an Ensemble Cast
| Parasite
| 
|-
| Best Original Screenplay
| Bong Joon-ho and Han Jin-won
| 
|-
| Best Editing
| Yang Jin-mo
| 
|-
| Best Production Design
| Lee Ha-jun
| 
|-
! rowspan="8" scope="row" |Chunsa Film Art Awards
| rowspan="7" | 18 July 2019
| Best Director
|Bong Joon-ho
| 
| rowspan="7" |
|-
| rowspan="2" | Best Actor
|Choi Woo-shik
| 
|-
|Song Kang-ho
| 
|-
| Best Actress
|Cho Yeo-jeong
| 
|-
| Best Supporting Actor
|Park Myung-hoon
| 
|-
| Best Supporting Actress
|Lee Jung-eun
| 
|-
| Best Screenplay
|Bong Joon-ho and Han Jin-won
| 
|-
| 19 June 2020
| White Crane Award
| Bong Joon-ho
| 
|
|-
! scope="row" rowspan="6"|Cine 21 Awards
|rowspan=6|24 December 2019
| Best Film of The Year
| Parasite
| 
|rowspan=6|
|-
| Best Director of The Year
| Bong Joon-ho
| 
|-
| Best Actor of The Year
| Song Kang-ho
| 
|-
| Best Actress of The Year
| Lee Jung-eun
| 
|-
| Best Screenplay of The Year
| Bong Joon-ho and Han Jin-won
| 
|-
| Best Cinematographer of The Year
| Hong Kyung-pyo
| 
|-
! scope="row" |Cinema Writers Circle Awards
| 20 January 2020
| Best Foreign Film
| rowspan="4" |Parasite
| 
|
|-
! scope="row" |Clio Awards
| 21 November 2019
| Theatrical: Trailers
| 
|
|-
! rowspan="7" scope="row"|Columbus Film Critics Association Awards
| rowspan="7"|2 January 2020
| Best Film
| 
| rowspan="7"|
|-
| Best Foreign Language Film
| 
|-
| Best Director
| Bong Joon-ho
| 
|-
| Best Original Screenplay
| Bong Joon-ho and Han Jin-won
| 
|-
| Best Cinematography
| Hong Kyung-pyo
| 
|-
| Best Film Editing
| Yang Jin-mo
| 
|-
| Best Ensemble
| rowspan="3" |Parasite
| 
|-
! scope="row" |Crested Butte Film Festival
| 29 September 2019
| Best Narrative Film
| 
|
|-
! rowspan="7" scope="row" |Critics' Choice Movie Awards
| rowspan="7" |12 January 2020
|Best Picture
| 
| rowspan="7" |
|-
|Best Director
|Bong Joon-ho
| 
|-
|Best Acting Ensemble
|Parasite
| 
|-
|Best Original Screenplay
|Bong Joon-ho and Han Jin-won
| 
|-
|Best Production Design
| Lee Ha-jun
| 
|-
|Best Editing
|Yang Jin-mo
| 
|-
|Best Foreign Language Film
| rowspan="2" |Parasite
| 
|-
! rowspan="4" scope="row" |Dallas–Fort Worth Film Critics Association
| rowspan="4" |16 December 2019
|Best Film
| 
| rowspan="4" |
|-
|Best Director
|Bong Joon-ho
| 
|-
|Best Cinematography
| Hong Kyung-pyo
| 
|-
| Best Foreign Language Film
| rowspan="2" |Parasite
| 
|-
! scope="row" |David di Donatello Awards
| 3 April 2020
|Best Foreign Film
| 
|
|-
! rowspan="3" scope="row" |Denver Film Critics Society
| rowspan="3"|14 January 2020
| Best Director
| Bong Joon-ho
| 
| rowspan="3"|
|-
| Best Original Screenplay
| Bong Joon-ho and Han Jin-won
| 
|-
| Best Foreign Language Film
| rowspan="2"|Parasite
| 
|-
! rowspan="4" scope="row" |Detroit Film Critics Society
| rowspan="4" |9 December 2019
|Best Film
|  
| rowspan="4" |
|-
|Best Director
|Bong Joon-ho
| 
|-
|Best Screenplay
|Bong Joon-ho and Han Jin-won
| 
|-
| Best Ensemble
| rowspan="2"|Parasite
| 
|-
! scope="row" |Días de Cine Awards
| 14 January 2020
| Best Foreign Film 
| 
| 
|-
! rowspan="8" scope="row" |Director's Cut Awards
| rowspan="8" | 12 December 2019
| Best Director 
|Bong Joon-ho
| 
| rowspan="8" |
|-
| rowspan="2" | Best Actor
|Choi Woo-shik
| 
|-
|Song Kang-ho
| 
|-
| rowspan="2" | Best Actress
|Lee Jung-eun
| 
|-
|Cho Yeo-jeong
| 
|-
| Best Screenplay
|Bong Joon-ho and Han Jin-won
| 
|-
| Best New Actor 
| Park Myung-hoon
| 
|-
| Best New Actress 
|Jang Hye-jin
| 
|-
! scope="row" |Directors Guild of America Awards
|25 January 2020
|Outstanding Directing – Feature Film
|Bong Joon-ho
| 
|
|-
! rowspan="6" scope="row" |Dorian Awards
| rowspan="6" |8 January 2020
|Film of the Year
|Parasite
| 
| rowspan="6" |
|-
| Director of the Year
|Bong Joon-ho
| 
|-
| Supporting Film Performance of the Year — Actor
|Song Kang-ho
| 
|-
| Foreign Language Film of the Year
|Parasite
| 
|-
| Screenplay of the Year
|Bong Joon-ho and Han Jin-won
| 
|-
| Visually Striking Film of the Year
| Parasite
| 
|-
! scope="row" |Eurasia International Film Festival 
| 6 July 2019
| Best Director
| Bong Joon-ho
| 
|
|-
! scope="row" |Fantastic Fest
| 26 September 2019
| rowspan="2" |Audience Award
| rowspan="3" |Parasite
| 
|
|-
! scope="row" |Film from the South
| 16 November 2019
| 
|
|-
! scope="row" rowspan="2"|Festival SESC Melhores Filmes
| rowspan="2"|19 August 2020
| Best International Film
| 
| rowspan="2"|
|-
| Best International Director
| Bong Joon-ho
| 
|-
! rowspan="3" scope="row" |Florida Film Critics Circle
| rowspan="3" | 23 December 2019
|Best Original Screenplay
|Bong Joon-ho and Han Jin-won
| 
| rowspan="3" |
|-
|Best Ensemble
| rowspan="4" |Parasite
| 
|-
|Best Foreign Language Film
| 
|-
! scope="row"|Fotogramas de Plata
| 12 November 2019
| Best Foreign Film
| 
|
|-
! rowspan="8" scope="row" |Georgia Film Critics Association
| rowspan="8" |10 January 2020
| Best Picture
| 
| rowspan="8" |
|-
| Best Director
|Bong Joon-ho
| 
|-
| Best Original Screenplay
|Bong Joon-ho and Han Jin-won
| 
|-
| Best Production Design
| Lee Ha-jun
| 
|-
| Best Original Score
| Jung Jae-il
| 
|-
| Best Original Song
| "A Glass of Soju" by Jung Jae-il and Bong Joon-ho
| 
|-
| Best Ensemble
| Parasite
| 
|-
| Best Foreign Language Film
| Parasite
| 
|-
! scope="row" |Globes de Cristal Awards
| 14 March 2020
| Best Foreign Film
| Parasite
| 
|
|-
! rowspan="3" scope="row" |Golden Globe Awards
| rowspan="3" |5 January 2020
|Best Director
|Bong Joon-ho
| 
| rowspan="3" |
|-
|Best Screenplay
|Bong Joon-ho and Han Jin-won
| 
|-
|Best Foreign Language Film
| Parasite
| 
|-

! rowspan="5" scope="row" | Golden Schmoes Awards
| rowspan="5" | 7 February 2020
| Favorite Movie of the Year
| Parasite
| 
| rowspan="5" |
|-
| Best Director of the Year
| Bong Joon-ho
| 
|-
| Best Screenplay of the Year
|Bong Joon-ho and Han Jin-won
| 
|-
| Trippiest Movie of the Year
| Parasite
| 
|-
| Biggest Surprise of the Year
| Parasite
| 
|-
! rowspan="11" scope="row" |Grand Bell Awards
| rowspan="11"|3 June 2020
| Best Film
|Parasite
| 
| rowspan="11" |
|-
| Best Director
|Bong Joon-ho
| 
|-
| Best Actor
|Song Kang-ho
| 
|-
| Best Supporting Actor
|Park Myung-hoon
| 
|-
| Best Supporting Actress
|Lee Jung-eun
| 
|-
| Best Screenplay
|Bong Joon-ho and Han Jin-won
| 
|-
| Best Cinematography
| Hong Kyung-pyo
| 
|-
| Best Film Editing
|Yang Jin-mo
| 
|- 
| Best Lighting
| Kim Chang-ho
| 
|-
| Best Music
| Jung Jae-il
| 
|-
| Best Art Direction
| Lee Ha-jun
| 
|-
! scope="row"|Grande Prêmio do Cinema Brasileiro
| 11 October 2020
| Best Foreign Long Film
| rowspan="4" |Parasite
| 
|
|-
! scope="row" |Guldbagge Awards
|20 January 2020
|Best Foreign Film
| 
|
|-
! scope="row" |Hochi Film Awards
| 2 December 2020
| Best International Picture	
| 
| 
|-
! rowspan="6" scope="row" |Hollywood Critics Association Awards
| rowspan="6" | 9 January 2020
| Best Picture
| 
| rowspan="6" |
|-
| Best Male Director
|Bong Joon-ho
| 
|-
| Best Original Screenplay
|Bong Joon-ho and Han Jin-won
| 
|-
| Best Editing
|Yang Jin-mo
| 
|-
| Best Foreign Language Film
|Parasite
| 
|-
| Filmmaker Achievement Award
| rowspan="2" |Bong Joon-ho
| 
|-
! scope="row" |Hollywood Film Awards
|3 November 2019
| Hollywood Filmmaker Award
| 
|
|-
! scope="row" |Hollywood Music in Media Awards
| 20 November 2019
|Best Original Score in a Feature Film
| Jung Jae-il
| 
|
|-
! scope="row" |Hollywood Professional Association
| 19 November 2020
| Outstanding Editing – Theatrical Feature
| Yang Jin-mo
| 
|

|-
! rowspan="6"" scope="row" |Houston Film Critics Society
| rowspan="6" |2 January 2020
|Best Picture
|Parasite
| 
| rowspan="6" |
|-
|Best Director
|Bong Joon-ho
| 
|-
|Best Screenplay
|Bong Joon-ho and Han Jin-won
| 
|-
|Best Cinematography
| Hong Kyung-pyo
| 
|-
| Best Foreign Language Film
| rowspan="3" |Parasite
| 
|-
| Best Movie Poster Art
| 
|-
!  rowspan="4" scope="row" |Huading Awards
|  rowspan="4"|29 October 2020
| Best Global Motion Picture
| 
| rowspan="4" |
|-
| Best Global Director for a Motion Picture
| Bong Joon-ho
| 
|-
| Best Global Writing for a Motion Picture
| Bong Joon-ho and Han Jin-won
| 
|-
| Best Global Supporting Actress in a Motion Picture
| Park So-dam
| 
|-
! rowspan="5" scope="row" |IGN Awards
| rowspan="5" | 21 December 2019
| Best Movie of the Year
| rowspan="2" |Parasite
| 
| rowspan="5" |
|-
| Best Comedy Movie of the Year
| 
|-
| Best Director
|Bong Joon-ho
| 
|-
| Best Supporting Performer
|Song Kang-ho
| 
|-
| Best Movie Ensemble
| rowspan="3" |Parasite
| 
|-
! scope="row" |Independent Spirit Awards
|8 February 2020
|Best International Film
| 
|
|-
! rowspan="4" scope="row" |Indiana Film Journalists Association
|  rowspan="4"|16 December 2019
| Best Film
| 
| rowspan="4"|
|-
| Best Director
| rowspan="2"|Bong Joon-ho
| 
|-
| Original Vision Award 
| 
|-
| Best Foreign Language Film
| rowspan="2"|Parasite
| 
|-
! rowspan="10" scope="row" |IndieWire Critics Poll
| rowspan="10" |16 December 2019
| Best Film
| 
| rowspan="10" |
|-
| Best Director
|Bong Joon-ho
| 
|-
| Best Actor
| rowspan="2" |Song Kang-ho
| 
|-
| Best Supporting Actor
| 
|-
| rowspan="3" | Best Supporting Actress
|Park So-dam
| 
|-
|Cho Yeo-jeong
| 
|-
|Lee Jung-eun
| 
|-
| Best Screenplay
|Bong Joon-ho and Han Jin-won
| 
|-
| Best Cinematography
| Hong Kyung-pyo
| 
|-
| Best Foreign Film
| Parasite
| 
|-
! rowspan="9" scope="row" |International Cinephile Society Awards
| 25 May 2019
| Best Director
| Bong Joon-ho
| 
| 
|-
| rowspan="8" | 5 February 2020
| Best Picture
| Parasite
| 
| rowspan="8" |
|-
| Best Director
|Bong Joon-ho
| 
|-
| Best Supporting Actor
|Song Kang-ho
| 
|-
| Best Supporting Actress
|Cho Yeo-jeong
| 
|-
| Best Original Screenplay
|Bong Joon-ho and Han Jin-won
| 
|-
| Best Ensemble
|Parasite
| 
|-
| Best Editing
|Yang Jin-mo
| 
|-
| Best Production Design
| Lee Ha-jun
| 
|-
! scope="row" |International Film Festival Awards Macao
| 8 October 2019
| Asian Blockbuster Film 2019
| rowspan=2|Parasite
| 
|<ref>{{cite web|url=https://www.hollywoodreporter.com/news/2019-macao-film-festival-full-winners-list-1261282|title=Parasite,' 'Give Me Liberty' Among Winners at Macao Film Festival Awards|website=The Hollywood Reporter}}</ref>
|-
! scope="row" |International Film Festival Cinematik
| 15 September 2019
| Audience Award
| 
|
|-
! scope="row" |International Film Festival Rotterdam
| 31 January 2020
| BankGiro Loterij Audience Award
|Parasite (B&W Version)
| 
|
|-
! scope="row"|Japan Academy Film Prize
| 19 March 2021
| Outstanding Foreign Language Film
| Parasite| 
|
|-
! scope="row"|Jecheon International Music & Film Festival
| 9 August 2019	
| Person of the Year in Film Industry Award
| Bong Joon-ho
| 
|
|-
! rowspan="4" scope="row"|Kansas City Film Critics Circle
| rowspan="4"|15 December 2019
| Best Film
|Parasite| 
| rowspan="4"|
|- 
| Best Director
| Bong Joon-ho
| 
|-
| Best Original Screenplay
| Bong Joon-ho and Han Jin-won
| 
|-
| Best Foreign Language Film
| rowspan=2|Parasite| 
|-
! rowspan="3" scope="row" |Kinema Junpo Awards
| rowspan="3"|10 February 2021 
| Best Foreign Language Film
| 
| rowspan=3|
|-
| Best Foreign Language Film Director
| rowspan=2|Bong Joon-ho
| 
|-
| Readers’ Choice Best Foreign Language Film Director
| 
|-
! rowspan="4" scope="row" |Korean Association of Film Critics Awards
| rowspan="4" | 13 November 2019
| Best Film
|Parasite| 
| rowspan="4" |
|-
| Best Director
|Bong Joon-ho
| 
|-
| Best Cinematography
| Hong Kyung-pyo
| 
|-
| Top 10 Films of the Year
| Parasite| 
|-
! scope="row" rowspan="3"|Korean Film Producers Association Awards
| rowspan="3"|17 December 2019
| Best Director
| Bong Joon-ho
| 
| rowspan="3"|
|-
| Best Lighting
| Kim Chang-ho
| 
|-
| Best Art Direction
| Lee Ha-joon
| 
|-
! scope="row" rowspan="3"|Las Vegas Film Critics Society Awards 
| rowspan="3"|13 December 2019
| Best Picture
| rowspan="3"|Parasite| 
| rowspan="3"|
|-
| Best Foreign Film	
| 
|-
| LVFCS Top 10 Films of 2019	
| 
|-
! scope="row" |Locarno International Film Festival
| 12 August 2019
| Excellence Award
| Song Kang-ho
| 
| 
|-
! rowspan="5" scope="row" |London Critics' Circle Film Awards
| rowspan="5" |30 January 2020
|Film of the Year
| Parasite| 
| rowspan="5" |
|-
|Director of the Year
|Bong Joon-ho
|
|-
|Screenwriter of the Year
|Bong Joon-ho and Han Jin-won
|
|-
| Technical Achievement of the Year
| Lee Ha-jun
|
|-
|Foreign Language Film of the Year
| rowspan="2" |Parasite|
|-
! rowspan="5" scope="row" |Los Angeles Film Critics Association
| rowspan="5" |11 January 2020
|Best Film
| 
| rowspan="5" |
|-
|Best Director
|Bong Joon-ho
| 
|-
|Best Supporting Actor
|Song Kang-ho
| 
|-
|Best Screenplay
|Bong Joon-ho and Han Jin-won
| 
|-
|Best Production Design
| Lee Ha-jun
| 
|-
! scope="row" |Mainichi Film Awards
| 17 February 2021
| Best Foreign Film
| Parasite| 
| 
|-
! scope="row" |Motion Picture Sound Editors Golden Reel Awards
| 19 January 2020
| Feature - Foreign Language
| Choi Tae-young (Supervising Sound Editor) Kang Hye-young (Sound Designer, Sound Effects Editor) Kim Byung-in (Supervising ADR Editor) Park Sung-gyun (Foley Artist) Lee Chung-gyu (Foley Artist) Shin I-na (Foley Editor)
| 
|
|-
! scope="row" |Munich International Film Festival
| 6 July 2019
|The ARRI/OSRAM Award
| rowspan="3" |Parasite| 
|
|-
! scope="row" |National Board of Review
|3 December 2019
|Best Foreign Language Film
| 
|
|-
! rowspan="4" scope="row" |National Society of Film Critics
| rowspan="4" |4 January 2020
|Best Picture
| 
| rowspan="4" |
|-
|Best Director
|Bong Joon-ho
| 
|-
|Best Supporting Actor
|Song Kang-ho
| 
|-
|Best Screenplay
|Bong Joon-ho and Han Jin-won
| 
|-
! scope="row" |New York Film Critics Circle
|7 January 2020
|Best Foreign Language Film
| rowspan="3" |Parasite| 
|
|-
! rowspan="4" scope="row" |New York Film Critics Online
| rowspan="4" |7 December 2019
| Top 10 Films
| 
| rowspan="4" |
|-
| Best Film
| 
|-
| Best Director
|Bong Joon-ho
| 
|-
| Best Screenplay
|Bong Joon-ho and Han Jin-won
| 
|-
! scope="row" |Nikkan Sports Film Awards
| 28 December 2020
| Best Foreign Film
| rowspan="4"|Parasite| 
|
|-
! rowspan="2" scope="row" |Oklahoma Film Critics Circle Awards
| rowspan="2"|15 December 2019
| Top 10 Films
| 
| rowspan="2"|
|-
| Best Foreign Language Film
| 
|-
! rowspan="7" scope="row" |Online Film Critics Society
| rowspan="7" |6 January 2020
|Best Picture
| 
| rowspan="7" |
|-
|Best Director
|Bong Joon-ho
| 
|-
|Best Supporting Actor
|Song Kang-ho
| 
|-
|Best Original Screenplay
|Bong Joon-ho and Han Jin-won
| 
|-
|Best Editing
|Yang Jin-mo
| 
|-
|Best Film Not in the English Language
| rowspan="2" |Parasite| 
|-
| Technical Achievement Award - Best Production Design
| 
|-
! scope="row" |Palm Springs International Film Festival
| 13 January 2020
| FIPRESCI Prize for Best International Screenplay
|Bong Joon-ho and Han Jin-won
| 
|
|-
! rowspan="2" scope="row" |Phoenix Film Critics Society Awards
| rowspan="2"|17 December 2019
| PFCS TOP TEN
| rowspan="2"|Parasite| 
|  rowspan="2"|
|-
| Best Foreign Language Film
| 
|-
! scope="row" |Producers Guild of America Awards
|18 January 2020
|Best Theatrical Motion Picture
|Kwak Sin-ae and Bong Joon-ho
| 
|
|-
! scope="row" |Robert Awards
|26 January 2020
|Best Non-English Language Film
| rowspan="2"|Parasite|
|
|-
! scope="row" |Rondo Hatton Classic Horror Awards	
|6 April 2020
|Best Film of 2019
|
|
|-
! rowspan="2" scope="row" |San Diego Film Critics Society
| rowspan="2" | 9 December 2019
|Best Original Screenplay
|Bong Joon-ho and Han Jin-won
| 
| rowspan="2" |
|-
|Best Foreign Language Film
| rowspan="2" |Parasite| 
|-
! rowspan="7" scope="row" |San Francisco Bay Area Film Critics Circle
| rowspan="7" |16 December 2019
|Best Picture
| 
| rowspan="7" |
|-
|Best Director
|Bong Joon-ho
| 
|-
|Best Supporting Actor
|Song Kang-ho
| 
|-
|Best Original Screenplay
|Bong Joon-ho and Han Jin-won
| 
|-
| Best Production Design
| Lee Ha-jun
| 
|-
| Best Editing
|Yang Jin-mo
| 
|-
|Best Foreign Language Film
| rowspan="3" |Parasite| 
|-
! scope="row" |San Sebastián International Film Festival
| 20 September 2019
|FIPRESCI Grand Prix
| 
|
|-
! scope="row" |Sant Jordi Awards
| 20 April 2020
| Best Foreign Film
| 
|
|-
! scope="row" |Santa Barbara International Film Festival
| 23 January 2020
| Outstanding Director of the Year Award
|Bong Joon-ho
| 
|
|-
! scope="row" |São Paulo International Film Festival
| 30 October 2019
| Audience Award ― Best International Fiction Film
|Parasite| 
|
|-
! rowspan="3" scope="row" |Satellite Awards
| rowspan="3" |21 January 2020
|Best Director
|Bong Joon-ho
| 
| rowspan="3" |
|-
|Best Original Screenplay
|Bong Joon-ho and Han Jin-won
| 
|-
|Best Foreign Language Film
|rowspan=2|Parasite| 
|-
! rowspan="4" scope="row" |Saturn Awards
| rowspan="4" | 26 October 2021
|Best International Film
| 
| rowspan="4" |
|-
|Best Writing
|Bong Joon-ho and Han Jin-won
| 
|-
|Best Editing
| Yang Jin-mo
| 
|-
|Best Music
| Jung Jae-il
| 
|-
! scope="row" |Screen Actors Guild Awards
|19 January 2020
|Outstanding Performance by a Cast in a Motion Picture
|Cho Yeo-jeong, Choi Woo-shik, Jang Hye-jin, Jung Hyeon-jun, Jung Ziso, Lee Jung-eun, Lee Sun-kyun, Park Myung-hoon, Park So-dam, and Song Kang-ho
| 
|
|- 
! rowspan="9" scope="row" |Seattle Film Critics Society
| rowspan="9" | 16 December 2019
| Best Picture
|Parasite| 
| rowspan="9" |
|-
| Best Director
|Bong Joon-ho
| 
|-
| Best Supporting Actor
|Song Kang-ho
| 
|-
| Best Ensemble
|Parasite| 
|-
| Best Screenplay
|Bong Joon-ho and Han Jin-won
| 
|-
| Best Editing
|Yang Jin-mo
| 
|-
| Best Cinematography
| Hong Kyung-pyo
| 
|-
| Best Production Design
| Lee Ha-jun
| 
|-
| Best Foreign Language Film
| rowspan="2"|Parasite| 
|-
! rowspan="4" scope="row" |Southeastern Film Critics Association Awards     
| rowspan="4"|9 December 2019
| Best Picture
| 
| rowspan="4" |
|-
| Best Director
| Bong Joon-ho
| 
|-
| Best Original Screenplay
| Bong Joon-ho and Han Jin-won
| 
|-
| Best Foreign Language Film
| Parasite| 
|-
! rowspan="6" scope="row" |St. Louis Film Critics Association
| rowspan="6" | 15 December 2019
|Best Director
|Bong Joon-ho
| 
| rowspan="6" |
|-
|Best Original Screenplay
|Bong Joon-ho and Han Jin-won
| 
|-
| Best Editing
|Yang Jin-mo
| 
|-
| Best Production Design
| Lee Ha-jun
| 
|-
| Best Horror Film
| rowspan="3" |Parasite| 
|-
| Best Foreign Film
| 
|-
! scope="row" |Sydney Film Festival
| 16 June 2019
| Best Film
| 
|
|-
! scope="row" |Tallgrass Film Festival
| 20 October 2019
| Excellence in the Art of Filmmaking
|Bong Joon-ho
| 
|
|-
! rowspan="4" scope="row" |Toronto Film Critics Association
| rowspan="4" |8 December 2019
|Best Film
|Parasite| 
| rowspan="4" |
|-
|Best Director
|Bong Joon-ho
| 
|-
|Best Screenplay
|Bong Joon-ho and Han Jin-won
| 
|-
|Best Foreign Language Film
| rowspan="5" |Parasite| 
|-
! scope="row" |Toronto International Film Festival
|15 September 2019
|Grolsch People's Choice Award
| 
|
|-
! scope="row" |Tromsø International Film Festival
| 19 January 2020
| The Tromsø Audience Award
| 
|
|-
! scope="row"|Turkish Film Critics Association
| 7 January 2020
| Best Foreign Film
| 
|
|-
! rowspan="3" scope="row" |Utah Film Critics Association Awards
| rowspan="3" |23 December 2019
| Best Picture
| 
| rowspan="3" |
|-
| Best Original Screenplay
| Bong Joon-ho and Han Jin-won
| 
|-
| Best Non-English Language Film
| rowspan=2|Parasite| 
|-
! rowspan="4" scope="row" |Vancouver Film Critics Circle
| rowspan="4" |16 December 2019
|Best Film
| 
| rowspan="4" |
|-
|Best Director
|Bong Joon-ho
| 
|-
| Best Screenplay
|Bong Joon-ho and Han Jin-won
| 
|-
|Best Foreign Language Film
| rowspan="4" |Parasite| 
|-
! scope="row" |Vancouver International Film Festival
| 11 October 2019
| Super Channel People's Choice Award
| 
|
|-
! scope="row" |Village Voice Film Poll
| 14 January 2020
| Best Picture
| 
|
|-
! rowspan="7" scope="row" |Washington D.C. Area Film Critics Association
| rowspan="7" |8 December 2019
|Best Film
| 
| rowspan="7" |
|-
|Best Director
|Bong Joon-ho
| 
|-
|Best Ensemble
|Parasite| 
|-
|Best Original Screenplay
|Bong Joon-ho and Han Jin-won
| 
|-
| Best Production Design
| Lee Ha-jun
| 
|-
| Best Editing
|Yang Jin-mo
| 
|-
|Best Foreign Language Film
|Parasite| 
|-
! scope="row" |Women In Film Korea Festival
| 11 December 2019
| Best Producer
| Kwak Sin-ae
| 
| 
|-
! scope="row" |Writers Guild of America Awards
|1 February 2020
|Best Original Screenplay
|Bong Joon-ho and Han Jin-won
| 
|
|-
|}

 World records 

Top-ten listsParasite appeared on many critics' year-end top-ten lists, among them:

 1st Alissa Wilkinson, Vox 1st Angie Han, Mashable 1st Barry Hertz, The Globe and Mail 1st Ben Travers, IndieWire 1st Candice Frederick, Harper's Bazaar 1st Cary Darling, Houston Chronicle 1st Christy Lemire, RogerEbert.com 1st Dan Jackson, Thrillist 1st David Crow, Den of Geek 1st Don Kaye, Den of Geek 1st Film Comment 1st Film School Rejects 
 1st Flood Magazine 1st Godfrey Cheshire, RogerEbert.com 1st Guy Lodge, The Guardian 1st Hyperallergic 1st IGN 1st IndieWire (300+ Critics Survey)
 1st Jessica Kiang and The Playlist Staff, The Playlist 1st Justin Chang, Los Angeles Times 1st Karen Han, Polygon 1st Katie Rife, The A.V. Club 1st Keith Watson, Slant Magazine 1st Laura Di Girolamo, Exclaim! 1st Leah Greenblatt, Entertainment Weekly 1st Matt Goldberg, Collider 1st Matt Neglia, Next Best Picture 1st Matthew Jacobs, Huffington Post 1st Michael Phillips, Chicago Tribune 1st Monica Castillo, RogerEbert.com 1st Nick Allen, RogerEbert.com 1st Noel Murray, The A.V. Club 1st Online Film Critics Society
 1st Richard Lawson, Vanity Fair 1st Rotten Tomatoes
 1st Sara Stewart, New York Post 1st Sarah Ward, Screen Daily 1st Sean P. Means, Salt Lake Tribune 1st Seongyong Cho, RogerEbert.com 1st Sydney Morning Herald 1st Tasha Robinson, Polygon 1st Tom Reimann, Collider 1st Valerie Ettenhofer, Film School Rejects 1st Vinnie Mancuso, Collider 1st - WatchMojo.Com
 2nd Alex Biese, Asbury Park Press 2nd Anne Thompson, IndieWire 2nd Bob Strauss, Los Angeles Daily News 2nd David Ehrlich, IndieWire 2nd David Rooney The Hollywood Reporter 2nd Jonathan Sim, Vocal 
 2nd Kate Erbland, IndieWire 2nd Mark Hughes, Forbes 
 2nd Matt Zoller Seitz, RogerEbert.com 2nd Sean Fennessey and Adam Nayman, The Ringer 2nd Sight & Sound 3rd A. O. Scott, The New York Times 3rd Alison Willmore, New York magazine 3rd Amy Taubin, Artforum 3rd Bilge Ebiri, New York magazine 3rd Complex 3rd Consequence of Sound 3rd David Sims, The Atlantic 3rd Good Morning America 3rd Lawrence Toppman, The Charlotte Observer 3rd Manohla Dargis, The New York Times 3rd Mark Dujsik, RogerEbert.com 3rd Matt Singer, ScreenCrush 3rd Max Weiss, Baltimore 3rd Natalie Zutter, Den of Geek 3rd Peter Sobczynski, RogerEbert.com 3rd Peter Travers, Rolling Stone 3rd Samuel R. Murian, Parade 3rd Ty Burr, Boston Globe 3rd Yahoo! Entertainment 4th Adam Chitwood, Collider 4th Allison Shoemaker, RogerEbert.com 4th Alonso Duralde, The Wrap 4th Brian Tallerico, RogerEbert.com 4th Jake Coyle, Associated Press 4th Johnny Oleksinski, New York Post 4th Kristy Puchko, RogerEbert.com 4th Mara Reinstein, Us Weekly 4th Matt Patches, Polygon 4th Michal Oleszczyk, RogerEbert.com 4th Odie Henderson, RogerEbert.com 4th Sheila O'Malley, RogerEbert.com 4th Sheri Linden, The Hollywood Reporter 4th Tom Brook, Talking Movies 5th David Edelstein, Vulture 5th Derek Smith, Slant Magazine 5th Justin Kroll, Variety 6th Scott Feinberg, The Hollywood Reporter 5th Tomris Laffly, RogerEbert.com 6th Caroline Siede, The A.V. Club 6th Collin Souter, RogerEbert.com 6th Eli Glasner, CBC 6th Eric Kohn, IndieWire 6th Jon Frosch. The Hollywood Reporter 6th Joshua Rothkopf, Time Out New York 6th Stephanie Zacharek, Time 6th Kyle Smith, National Review 7th Marlow Stern, The Daily Beast 8th Lindsey Bahr, Associated Press 9th Brian Truitt, USA Today 9th Eugene Hernandez, Film at Lincoln Center 9th Max O'Connell, RogerEbert.com 9th Peter Rainer, The Christian Science Monitor 9th Richard Roeper, Chicago Sun-Times 10th Ben Kenigsberg, RogerEbert.com 10th Tom Gliatto, People magazineTop 10 (not ranked)
 Amy Kaufman, Los Angeles Times Cameron Bailey, Toronto International Film Festival James Verniere, Boston Herald Joe Morgenstern, The Wall Street Journal Dana Stevens, Slate Sheila Nevins, MTV Documentary Films Stephen Rebello, PlayboyParasite also appeared on many critics' Best-of-the-decade top 10 lists, among them:

 1st Den of Geek 1st Karen Han, Polygon 2nd Kevin O'Connor, The Ringer 3rd Amanda Dobbins, The Ringer 3rd Film School Rejects 4th Norman Wilner, Now Magazine 4th Sean P. Means, Salt Lake Tribune 5th /Film 5th Richard Lawson, Vanity Fair 7th Gregory Ellwood, The Playlist 8th Los Angeles Film Critics Association 10th Chris Plante, PolygonOn Metacritic, Parasite'' was rated as the best film of 2019 and ranked 7th among the films with the highest scores of the decade.  it is the 41st highest rated film of all time on the website.

See also

 2019 in film

Notes

References

External links 
 

Lists of accolades by film